Roman Mykhaylovych Mysak (born 9 September 1991) is a Ukrainian professional footballer who plays as a goalkeeper for Alashkert.

Career
Mysak is a product of Karpaty Lviv academy. His first coach was Andriy Hriner.

Karpaty Lviv
He made his debut for Karpaty Lviv as a second-half substitute against FC Zorya Luhansk on 6 October 2012 in the Ukrainian Premier League.

Loan to Krymteplytsia Molodizhne
In early 2011, he was loaned to FC Krymteplytsia Molodizhne in the Ukrainian First League, where he was the club's main goalkeeper for one and a half seasons.

AGF Aarhus
He moved to Danish Superliga club AGF Aarhus on 31 August 2018. He signed an initial contract for one year. He left the club in February 2019.

Rukh Lviv
From 2019 until 2021 he played for Rukh Lviv, appearing in 39 matches.

Desna Chernihiv
In August 2021 he moved to Ukrainian Premier League club Desna Chernihiv. On 12 September he made his debut with the club against Vorskla Poltava at the Oleksiy Butovsky Vorskla Stadium.

Ararat Yerevan
On 12 February 2023 Mysak moved to Alashkert.

Career statistics

Club

Gallery

References

External links
Profile on Official website of FC Desna Chernihiv
 
 

1991 births
Living people
Sportspeople from Lviv
Ukrainian footballers
Ukrainian expatriate footballers
FC Karpaty Lviv players
FC Karpaty-2 Lviv players
FC Krymteplytsia Molodizhne players
FC Olimpik Donetsk players
Aarhus Gymnastikforening players
FC Rukh Lviv players
FC Desna Chernihiv players
FC Alashkert players
Association football goalkeepers
Ukrainian Premier League players
Ukrainian First League players
Ukrainian Second League players
[[Armenian Premier League players]]
Expatriate men's footballers in Denmark
Ukrainian expatriate sportspeople in Denmark
Expatriate footballers in Armenia
Ukrainian expatriate sportspeople in Armenia